Elinor "Ellie" Miller Greenberg (November 13, 1932 – September 15, 2021) was an American author educationalist and speech pathologist, an expert in the field of adult education and experiential learning, as well as a former civil rights activist. She saw access to education as a social justice issue, and spent over thirty years creating higher education programs for non-traditional students. She headed the University Without Walls program in the 1970s; created a weekend BSN program for nurses in rural Colorado; established a degree program for Colorado prison inmates and ex-offenders; and established online master's degree programs for nurses in the 1990s. She was inducted into the Colorado Women's Hall of Fame in 2010.

Personal life and education

She was born in Brooklyn, New York, in 1932, and grew up in New Jersey. Her ancestors were Ukrainian Jewish refugees who emigrated to the United States in the early 20th century. She graduated from Mount Holyoke College in 1953 with a Bachelor of Arts degree in Speech and Psychology, and earned a Master of Arts degree in Speech Pathology from the University of Wisconsin-Madison in 1954.

In the mid-1950s, she moved to Littleton, Colorado to take her first professional job as a speech therapist, where she then met and married her late husband, Manny. They had three children and four grandchildren together. Ellie was active in the local community, having co-founded the Littleton Council for Human Relations, which campaigned for fair housing legislation and brought Martin Luther King Jr., to Littleton in 1964. Over the years she continued her studies at the University of Northern Colorado and received her Doctor of Education degree in 1981.

Career

Greenberg began her career in the 1950s as a speech pathologist, diagnosing and treating children and adults with speech problems stemming from brain injury, stroke, and developmental delays. Between 1967 and 1971 she taught at the University of Colorado and Loretto Heights College.

In 1971, Greenberg founded the University Without Walls (UWW) program at Loretto Heights College. As UWW director, she developed specialized educational programs for non-traditional students, including Colorado prison inmates and ex-offenders; at-risk high school students; Native American mental health workers; teachers, police officers, returning adult students, Spanish-speaking students, Elderhostel students, and others. She served as National Coordinator for the consortium of 33 undergraduate UWW institutions from 1977 to 1979.

In the 1980s, she established a weekend BSN program for nurses in rural Colorado which was the first of its kind in the state. She established a prepaid tuition program for 39,000 US West employees in 14 states. At the University of Colorado Health Sciences Center in the 1990s, she established online master's degree programs for physician assistants, nurse practitioners, and nurse midwives in under-served areas of Arizona, Colorado, New Mexico, and Wyoming. She was regional coordinator for the Council for Adult and Experiential Learning, and the founding director of Project Leadership, which provided leadership research and training for the boards of nonprofit organizations.

In addition to developing adult education programs, Greenberg trained other educators to work with non-traditional students. She was a guest faculty member at the Harvard Graduate School of Education in 1982 and lectured at many other institutions. Much of her work drew on the research of William G. Perry, Jr., whose "Perry Scheme" she adapted for use in designing adult education programs.

In 1991 she founded a consulting and publishing firm, EMG and Associates. In 1993 she traveled to Germany and visited the Dachau concentration camp as part of a delegation that was profiled in a television documentary, Journey for Justice.

She served on numerous boards and commissions, including the Colorado Women's Economic Development Council, the Colorado Women's Leadership Coalition, Women's Forum, State Board for Community Colleges and Occupational Education, the Anti-Defamation League, the Colorado Board of Continuing Legal and Judicial Education, the Colorado Judicial Institute, and MESA.

Honors and awards

Greenberg received numerous honors and awards over the years. The following is a partial list.

 Colorado Women's Chamber of Commerce Lifetime Achievement Award, 2014
 Wilma J. Webb Founders Award, 2014
 Induction into the Colorado Women's Hall of Fame, 2010
 Colorado MESA Service Award, 2006, 2007
 Martin Luther King Jr. Distinguished Service Award, Arapahoe Community College, 2003.
 Founding Mother Award, Colorado Women's Leadership Coalition, 1997
 Valuing Women's Work Award - Women's Bureau, U.S. Department of Labor, 1995
 Honorary Doctor of Humane Letters, Professional School of Psychology (CA), 1987
 Honorary Doctor of Letters, Saint Mary-of-the-Woods College (IN), 1983
 Minoru Yasui Community Volunteer Award; Proclamation of Elinor Miller Greenberg Day in Denver by Mayor Wellington Webb, 1991
 Woman of the Decade, Littleton Newspapers, 1970
 Human Relations Award, B'nai B'rith Women, 1968
 Distinguished Service Award, Littleton Education Association, 1968
 Citizen of the Year, Omega Psi Phi fraternity, 1966

Books

Greenberg authored, co-authored, or edited nine books and over 200 papers. Her tenth book was published posthumously.

References

External links
 Three Questions: Elinor Miller Greenberg at TEDx conference, 2013

1932 births
2021 deaths
21st-century American educators
Educators from Colorado
American people of Ukrainian-Jewish descent
People from Littleton, Colorado
People from Brooklyn
Mount Holyoke College alumni
University of Northern Colorado alumni
University of Wisconsin–Madison alumni
American women academics
20th-century American educators
20th-century American women educators
21st-century American women educators